The Sinheung Railway (Japanese: 新興鉄道株式会社, Shinkō Tetsudo Kabushiki Kaisha; Korean: 신흥철도주식회사, Sinheung Cheoldo Jusikhoesa), was a privately owned railway company in colonial era Korea. 

It was a subsidiary of the Chōsen Railway (Chōtetsu), colonial Korea's largest privately owned railway company, established in 1930 to operate a number of lines opened by Chōtetsu and one of its predecessors, the Chōsen Forestry Railway.

The Sinheung Railway was bought and absorbed by Chōtetsu on 22 April 1938; Chōtetsu subsequently split the Sinheung Railway's network into four separate lines: the Hamnam Line (Hamheung–Hamnam Sinhung/Sangtong/Jangpung), the Songheung Line (Hamnam Sinheung–Bujeonhoban), the Jangjin Line (Sangtong–Sasu), and the Namheung Line (West Hamheung–Seohojin).

References

Rail transport in North Korea
Rail transport in Korea
Defunct railway companies of Korea
Korea under Japanese rule
Defunct companies of Japan